Ouessa is a town in southern Burkina Faso, very close to the border of Ghana. Across the border is the town of Hamile.

References 

Populated places in the Sud-Ouest Region (Burkina Faso)